Hale is a city in Carroll County, Missouri, United States. The population was 375 at the 2020 census.

History
Hale was platted in 1833. The community was named after John P. Hale, a state legislator.

Geography
Hale is located at  (39.604241, -93.343713).

Demographics

As of 2000 the median income for a household in the city was $24,625, and the median income for a family was $45,250. Males had a median income of $33,214 versus $23,036 for females. The per capita income for the city was $17,790. About 9.5% of families and 15.6% of the population were below the poverty line.

2010 census
As of the census of 2010, there were 419 people, 176 households, and 112 families residing in the city. The population density was 698 people per square mile). There were 209 housing units at an average density of 348 per square mile. The racial makeup of the city was 97.1% White, and 2.4% from two or more races. American Indian or Alaskan Native of any race were .5% of the population.

There were 176 households, of which 30.7% had children under the age of 18 living with them, 44.9% were married couples living together, 8.5% were male householders with no wife present, 10.2% were female householders with no husband present, and 36.4% were non-families. 35.2% of all households were made up of individuals, and 34.7% had someone living alone who was 65 years of age or older. The average household size was 2.38 and the average family size was 3.01.

In the city the population was spread out, with 24.7% under the age of 18, 3.6% from 19 to 24, 24.9% from 25 to 44, 23.6% from 45 to 64, and 18.4% who were 65 years of age or older. The median age was 38.5 years.

References

External links
 Historic maps of Hale in the Sanborn Maps of Missouri Collection at the University of Missouri

Cities in Carroll County, Missouri
Cities in Missouri